Joshua Gerardus Petrus Wilhelmus Smits (born 6 November 1992) is a Dutch professional footballer who plays as a goalkeeper for Willem II. 

Smits started his football career at Astrantia and De Treffers, before moving to NEC in 2011. In the 2014–15 season, he made his debut in professional football for NEC, a club with which he reached promotion to the Eredivisie. After a two-year stint with Almere City, he joined Norwegian club Bodø/Glimt, winning the league title in his first season at the club.

Career

Early career
Smits started in the youth department of Astrantia SV in Middelaar as a five-year-old, first as an outfielder and from the age of 10 as a goalkeeper. He had already received goalkeeping practice at De Treffers, before he made the definitive move to the club's youth department at age 11. In the 2010–11 season, he played for the U17 team and was also the third goalkeeper for the first team. Due to an accident by the starting goalkeeper of De Treffers, Smits was on the bench in the Topklasse for a few matches.

NEC
In the summer of 2011, Smits was signed by NEC and was added to the first team as the third goalkeeper in September of that year after the departure of Jasper Cillessen. He initially played for the reserve team of Jong NEC/FC Oss. In April 2012, he sat on the bench of FC Oss for the home game against MVV behind Vincent van Trier. In January 2013, NEC signed Kalle Johnsson actively demoting Smits to fourth goalkeeper on the depth chart. He finished the season on loan at cooperation club FC Oss, where starter Luuk Koopmans had become injured. Smits, however, did not play and was reserve behind Richard Arends. He made his professional debut on 10 August 2014 against FC Eindhoven, in which NEC booked a 3–1 win. He was the starting goalkeeper of NEC in the 2014–15 season and was part of the team winning the league title. Three games before the end of the competition, it turned out that Smits had suffered a broken wrist and walked around with it for a long time. Smits had to miss the entire season after the club's comeback to the Eredivisie. In the 2016–17 season, Smits was fit again, but was kept out of the starting lineup by starter Joris Delle. On 28 May 2017, he was relegated with NEC back to the Eerste Divisie. That season, Smits became the starter again and he was in the pecking order above Delle. He started the first league match against Almere City, which NEC won 3–1.

Almere City
On 24 January 2018, Smits signed a contract for a season and a half with Almere City. He had an injury-riddled start with his new club, as he broke his arm in February 2018 and suffered a serious knee injury in August 2018. After Almere City had extended his contract for one year, Smits was finally able to make his debut for the club at the start of the 2019–20 season. He became the starting goalkeeper and in October 2019 his contract was extended until mid-2021.

Bodø/Glimt
On 12 June 2020, Smits signed a four-year contract with Norwegian club Bodø/Glimt playing in the top-tier Eliteserien. Smits quickly obtained the starting job, but did not return as a starter after another injury. In November 2020, Smits won the Eliteserien title with Bodø/Glimt; it was the club's first league title.

Willem II
On 25 June 2022, Smits signed a three-year contract with Willem II.

Career statistics

Club

Honours
NEC
Eerste Divisie: 2014–15

Bodø/Glimt
Eliteserien: 2020, 2021

References

External links
 

Living people
1992 births
Footballers from Nijmegen
Association football goalkeepers
Dutch footballers
De Treffers players
NEC Nijmegen players
TOP Oss players
Almere City FC players
FK Bodø/Glimt players
Willem II (football club) players
Eredivisie players
Eerste Divisie players
Eliteserien players
Dutch expatriate footballers
Dutch expatriate sportspeople in Norway
Expatriate footballers in Norway